Siu Ma Shan is a  high hill on Hong Kong Island, Hong Kong, close to Mount Cameron and Jardine's Lookout.

Wilson Trail Stage 2 passes near the summit of Siu Ma Shan.

See also 

List of mountains, peaks and hills in Hong Kong

References 

Butler
Eastern District, Hong Kong